Senegalia etilis is a species of plant in the family Fabaceae. It is found in Argentina and Bolivia. It is threatened by habitat loss.

References

etilis
Flora of Argentina
Flora of Bolivia
Vulnerable plants
Taxonomy articles created by Polbot